Karviná is a city in the Moravian-Silesian Region of the Czech Republic. It has about 50,000 inhabitants. It lies on the Olza River in the historical region of Cieszyn Silesia.

Karviná is known as an industrial city with tradition in coal mining. The historic centre in Karviná-Fryštát is well preserved and is protected by law as an urban monument zone.

Administrative parts
Karviná is made up of nine city parts and villages:

Doly
Fryštát
Hranice
Lázně Darkov
Louky
Mizerov
Nové Město
Ráj
Staré Město

Geography
It lies in the Ostrava Basin. The town is situated on the right bank of the Olza River. The territory is rich in ponds.

History

The first written mention of Karviná is from 1268. It was located on a trade route, which helped its development. It gained various privileges, but the prosperity ended with the Thirty Years' War.

The discovery of hard coal deposits in Karviná in the second half of the 18th century brought a major turnaround in the economic development of Karviná and the entire region. The less significant village of Karviná near the important town of Fryštát gained importance for the whole Austria-Hungary.

Following World War I, it was contested by Poland and Czechoslovakia, and after the split of Cieszyn Silesia in 1920 it became a part of Czechoslovakia as the main mining centre in the country. In 1923, it gained city rights.

In October 1938 was annexed by Poland, together with the entire region known as Zaolzie, and during World War II it was occupied by Nazi Germany. The Germans operated a Gestapo prison in the city, and several forced labour camps, including a Polenlager solely for Poles, a camp solely for Jews, and a subcamp of the Nazi prison in Cieszyn. After the war it again became a part of Czechoslovakia.

In 1948 Karviná, Fryštát, and the surrounding villages of Darkov, Ráj, and Staré Město were merged into one city named Karviná. The coat of arms of Fryštát was chosen as the coat of arms of Karviná and Fryštát became the historical centre of this industrial city. The period after World War II is characterised by the economic orientation on heavy industry. In 2003, Karviná became a statutory city.

Demographics
According to the 1980 census, at its peak, Karviná had 78,546 inhabitants, but the population dropped under 51,000. According to the 2011 census, 5.7% of the population are Poles and 5.4% of the population are Slovaks. The Polish population has been historically declining. In the past the town had a significant German community. There is also a growing Romani community.

Economy
Karviná is one of the most important coal mining centres in the country. Together with neighbouring cities it forms the industrial Ostrava-Karviná Coal Basin. Due to low profitability, however, mining is curtailed and in 2021, two mines were closed. Coal mining as the main economic activity in the city will be gradually replaced by revitalization of the landscape after mining.

Education
Karviná is the centre of education of the region with its wide range of specialised secondary schools and, especially, the School of Business Administration of the Silesian University in Opava.

Sport

Karviná, as a multi-ethnic city of Cieszyn Silesia, was a home to many football clubs established by particular ethnic groups after World War I. At that time many football clubs within the Polish, German, Czech, and Jewish communities were founded. The best known and most successful Polish club was PKS Polonia Karwina, founded in 1919. After World War II, the German and Jewish clubs were not reestablished. The Czech and Polish clubs existed until the 1950s, when as a part of a communist unification of sport in Czechoslovakia, the Czech clubs were joined to ZSJ OKD Mír Karviná and the Polish Polonia Karwina was incorporated into that club. Today, the only football club in the city is MFK Karviná, playing in the Czech National Football League.

Karviná is also home to a successful handball club, HCB Karviná, which became twice Czechoslovak champions and eleven times Czech champions. Other sport clubs in the city include two ice hockey teams SK Karviná (playing in the lower division) and HC Baník Karviná (playing in the 2nd Czech league), and the athletics club, with tennis, gymnastics, and ice skating being also very popular and established sports within the region.

Sights

The last remnant of the original village of Karviná is the baroque Church of Saint Peter of Alcántara in Doly.

Today the historic centre is located in Fryštát part of Karviná. The main sight is the Fryštát Castle. The original structure was rebuilt and reconstructed several times, after it was finally rebuilt in the Empire style in 1800. In the same time, the English castle park was founded. Nowadays it is owned by the city and since 1997 it has been open to the public.

The Sokolovských hrdinů Bridge in Darkov is a reinforced concrete road bridge from 1922–1925, protected as a cultural monument.

Notable people

Wacław Olszak (1868–1939), Polish mayor of Karviná (1929–1936)
Emanuel Grim (1883–1950), Polish Catholic priest and writer
Gustaw Morcinek (1891–1963), Polish writer
Louis Kentner (1905–1987), Hungarian-British pianist
Dana Zátopková (1922–2020), athlete
Wilhelm Przeczek (1936–2006), Polish writer
Dáša Vokatá (born 1954), singer-songwriter
Miloš Doležal (born 1966), musician
Eva Kurfürstová (born 1977), alpine skier
Radek Štěpánek (born 1978), tennis player
Petra Němcová (born 1979), model
Jaroslav Bába (born 1984), athlete
Denisa Rosolová (born 1986), athlete

Twin towns – sister cities

Karviná is twinned with:
 Jastrzębie-Zdrój, Poland
 Jaworzno, Poland
 Kaili, China
 Rybnik, Poland
 Wodzisław Śląski, Poland

References

Further reading

External links

 
Cities and towns in the Czech Republic
Populated places in Karviná District
Mining communities in the Czech Republic